Eduard Sergienko (born 18 February 1983) is a Ukrainian-born Kazakhstani football midfielder. He has been capped for the Kazakhstan national football team 19 times.

Career
In January 2016, Sergienko signed for FC Akzhayik.

Career statistics

Club

International

References

External links
Profile at club website
 
 
 
 

1981 births
Living people
People from Khartsyzk
Association football midfielders
Ukrainian footballers
Ukrainian expatriate footballers
Expatriate footballers in Kazakhstan
Naturalised citizens of Kazakhstan
Kazakhstani footballers
Kazakhstani expatriate footballers
Expatriate footballers in Belarus
Expatriate footballers in Russia
Kazakhstan international footballers
Kazakhstan under-21 international footballers
Kazakhstan Premier League players
FC Shakhtar-3 Donetsk players
FC Caspiy players
FC Ordabasy players
FC Zhenis Astana players
FC Shakhter Karagandy players
FC Atyrau players
FC Gomel players
FC Nizhny Novgorod (2007) players
FC Irtysh Pavlodar players
FC Taraz players
FC Akzhayik players
Sportspeople from Donetsk Oblast